The Bocktenhorn is a mountain of the Albula Alps, located west of the Scaletta Pass, in Graubünden, Switzerland.

References

External links
 Bocktenhorn on Hikr

Mountains of the Alps
Alpine three-thousanders
Mountains of Switzerland
Mountains of Graubünden
Davos